The 1981 Winfield Australian Masters was a professional invitational snooker tournament which took place between 25 and 27 June 1981 at the Tattersalls Club in Sydney, Australia.

The tournament was sponsored by Winfield and had a total prize fund of $60,000. There were two qualifying groups, played on a round-robin basis, with the top two players from each group progressing to the semi-finals. The final was decided on aggregated points scored over three frames. The event was recorded for broadcast on Channel 2, with transmissions running from 8 September 1981 to 10 November 1981.

There were four players in each group:

Eighteenth-ranked Tony Meo won his first title as a professional by defeating world number fourteen John Spencer over three frames in the final. The winning aggregate score is unknown.

References

Snooker non-ranking competitions
Snooker competitions in Australia
Australian Masters
Masters
Australian Masters